The 2018 Shooting Championships of the Americas took place in Guadalajara, Mexico from November 3 to November 10, 2018.

Men's events

Women's events

Mixed events

Medal table

References

External links
Timetable
Results Book

Shooting Championships of the Americas
2018 Shooting Championships